Woringen is a municipality in the district of Unterallgäu in Bavaria, Germany.

References

Unterallgäu